Regents' and Chancellor's Scholarships refer to distinctions conferred to applicants to University of California campuses. Regents' Scholarships are awarded by the Regents of the University of California and the Chancellor's Scholarship are awarded by each campus' Chancellor.

Notable Regent's Scholars
 Bradford Delson (born December 1, 1977) - UCLA - American musician and record producer, founding member of the American rock band Linkin Park
 Dan Riskin - UC San Diego - American entrepreneur and surgeon
 Mark E. Kalmansohn - UCLA (1974) - former prosecutor for the United States Department of Justice
 Monte Melkonian - UC Berkeley (1978) - American-Armenian militia leader, killed during the First Nagorno-Karabakh War
 James LuValle - UCLA - (1912 – 1993) was an American athlete and scientist.

Notable Chancellor's Scholars
 Zachary Dutton - UC Berkeley - American physicist

References

University of California
Scholarships in the United States